The  was a professional golf tournament in Japan, sponsored by Bridgestone. Founded in 1972, it had been an event on the Japan Golf Tour since in inaugural season in 1973. From 1972 to 1984, the title of the event was the Bridgestone Tournament, because it was only for professional players.

The tournament record is 265 (−23), set by Yuta Ikeda in 2010. The 2018 total purse was ¥150,000,000 with ¥30,000,000 going to the winner. For many years, the winner received an invite to the WGC-Bridgestone Invitational.

Tournament hosts
In 1972 the first Bridgestone Tournament was held at the Mitsukaido Golf Club. The following year, the tournament moved to the Tokyo Yomiuri Country Club. Since 1974, it has been held at the Sodegaura Country Club.

Winners

Notes

See also
 Bridgestone Aso Open

References

External links
 
Coverage on Japan Golf Tour's official site

Former Japan Golf Tour events
Golf tournaments in Japan
Sport in Chiba (city)
Bridgestone